You Better Believe It! is an album by Jazz musician and bandleader Gerald Wilson. Recorded in 1961 for the Pacific Jazz label, it featuring a 17 piece orchestra, the music is arranged, directed and mainly composed by Wilson. The orchestra is made up of west coast-based musicians such as Richard "Groove" Holmes, Harold Land, and Carmell Jones.

Reception

AllMusic rated the album with 4 stars; in his review, Joe Viglion said: "The 17-piece orchestra performs like a trio or quartet, each musician knowing where to be and when to execute, so the tension shifts and the moods change as subtle instrumentation slides in track by instrumental track. Shifting from quiet to quickly dramatic, the ideas keep flowing from Wilson's creative fount ".

Track listing 
All compositions by Gerald Wilson except as indicated
 "Blues for Yna Yna" - 6:51 	
 "Jeri" - 3:40 	
 "Moody Blue" - 3:05 	
 "Straight Up and Down" - 3:49 	
 "The Wailer" - 7:16 	
 "You Better Believe It" (Richard "Groove" Holmes, Gerald Wilson) - 5:16 	
 "Yvette"  - 3:33

Personnel 
Gerald Wilson - arranger and conductor
John Audino, Carmell Jones, Al Porcino (tracks 2, 3, 6 & 7), Jack Trainor (tracks 2, 3, 6 & 7), Ray Triscari (tracks 1, 4 & 5), Jimmy Zito (tracks 1, 4 & 5) - trumpet
Bob Edmondson, John Ewing, Lester Robertson (tracks 1, 4 & 5), Frank Strong (tracks 2, 3, 6 & 7) - trombone
Kenny Shroyer - bass trombone
Buddy Collette - clarinet, alto saxophone, flute
Harry Klee (tracks 1, 4 & 5), Joe Maini (tracks 2, 3, 6 & 7) - alto saxophone
Walter Benton (tracks 2, 3, 6 & 7), Teddy Edwards, Harold Land (tracks 1, 4 & 5) - tenor saxophone
Jack Nimitz (tracks 1, 4 & 5) Don Raffell (tracks 2, 3, 6 & 7) - baritone saxophone
Richard "Groove" Holmes - organ
Gene Edwards - guitar (tracks 2, 3, 6 & 7)
Jimmy Bond - bass
Mel Lewis - drums

References 

Gerald Wilson albums
1961 albums
Pacific Jazz Records albums
Albums arranged by Gerald Wilson
Albums conducted by Gerald Wilson